Margarete Markl (30 May 1902 – 8 January 1981) was an Austrian sculptor. Her work was part of the sculpture event in the art competition at the 1948 Summer Olympics.

References

1902 births
1981 deaths
20th-century Austrian sculptors
20th-century Austrian women artists
Austrian women sculptors
Olympic competitors in art competitions
Artists from Vienna